Always Be with You may refer to:
 Always Be with You (song), a 2001 song by Human Nature
 Always Be with You (film), a 2017 Hong Kong horror film